The Men's European Football Qualifiers for the 1972 Summer Olympics consisted of two stages, the first single elimination tournament and then group stage.

Play-off stage 

|}

Group stage

Group 1

Group 2

Group 3

Group 4

|}

References 

Football qualification for the 1968 Summer Olympics